Luzula parviflora is a species of flowering plant in the rush family known by the common name small-flowered woodrush. It has a northern circumboreal distribution.

Description
It is a perennial herb forming grasslike clumps of several erect stems up to half a meter in maximum height surrounded by many grasslike leaves. The inflorescence is an open array of many clusters of brown flowers on long branches.

Distribution
It has a circumboreal distribution, native throughout the Northern Hemisphere in northern Scandinavia, Asia and North America. 
It grows in moist areas, often on gravelly soils. It occurs at low elevations in colder regions, such as tundra; farther south it is restricted mainly to high mountains. It can grow in highly disturbed habitat, as evidenced by its ability to survive volcanic eruption and to thrive in the destroyed ecosystem on the most barren slopes of Mount St. Helens.

References

External links
Jepson Manual Treatment of Luzula parviflora
Luzula parviflora — U.C. Photo gallery

parviflora
Flora of the Arctic
Flora of Europe
Flora of North America
Flora of temperate Asia